Turner's Gap is a wind gap in the South Mountain Range of the Blue Ridge Mountains, located in Frederick County and Washington County, Maryland.  The gap is traversed by U.S. Route 40 Alternate, the old National Pike.  The Appalachian Trail also crosses the gap along the ridgeline.

Geography

To the east of the gap lies the Middletown Valley and to the west the Hagerstown Valley.

History

The Old South Mountain Inn and Dahlgren Chapel are located at Turner's Gap.

The first road through Turner's Gap was created in 1756 as the Road from Frederick to Fort Frederick that connected the town of Frederick with the new fort built as a result of Braddock's Defeat in 1755.

A land tract named Flonham patented on April 20, 1774, by Philip Jacob Shafer includes the immediate area near the Mountain House. Frederick Fox patented a land tract named Addition to Friendship on May 27, 1805. The tract stretches from Turner's Gap to Fox's Gap and consists of approximately 95 acres at Turner's Gap and 95 acres at Fox's Gap with 12 acres connecting the two larger segments. The connecting land became the path of the Wood Road and is today the path of the Appalachian Trail between Fox's and Turner's Gaps.

Turner's Gap was the scene of heavy fighting during the Battle of South Mountain in September 1862 during the American Civil War. The area is listed on the National Register of Historic Places as part of the Turner's and Fox's Gaps Historic District.

References

Valleys of Maryland
Wind gaps of the United States
South Mountain Range (Maryland−Pennsylvania)
Landforms of Frederick County, Maryland
Landforms of Washington County, Maryland
Appalachian Trail